Amrit Manthan ( The Changes of Amrit) is an Indian television soap opera, which premiered on 26 February 2012 and ran through 2 August 2013 on Life Ok. It is the story of two sisters who become each other's enemiesThis show was also broadcast as Bari Behna on Star Utsav.

The show took a seven years leap in February 2013 and a nine years leap in April 2013.

Plot 
Amrit Manthan is the story of two sisters Amrit and Nimrit. Starting off as best friends, fate leads them to turn into enemies. Nimrit survives as Amrit attempts to kill her. But her face is ruined and changed by plastic surgery and she returns as Natasha Oberoi to seize everything that Amrit has taken from her. A lookalike of Nimrit (later revealed to be her long lost twin), named Shivangi, comes to town and helps Nimrit in her battle against Amrit and succeeds. Shivangi then leaves to pursue her career and marries a superstar.

After a series of events, Nimrit thinks that her husband, Agam and Amrit have died, but they survive. Nimrit and Agam have a daughter named Gurbani. Amrit returns with Yug as her fiancé with an aim to ruin her sister's and Agam's lives. Amrit tries to incite Gurbani to rebel against her parents but fails. Eventually, the sisters set aside their difference and Amrit reforms herself. With Yug gone, Amrit marries Tej.

Agam is killed by Angad/Karan due to a misunderstanding. Angad forces Nimrit to marry him. Amrit is abducted by Yug who creates misunderstandings and has Amrit arrested. Rajjo helps rescue Amrit and exposes Yug as having tried to kill her and her family and has him arrested.

Amrit is pregnant with Tej’s child. Nimrit accepts Angad as her husband and is pregnant with his child.

Cast 

Adaa Khan as 
 Princess Amrit Kaur Sodhi Malik: Nimrit and Shivangi's sister; Agam's ex-wife; Tej's second wife (2012–13)
 Rajjo: Amrit's Doppelganger
Dimple Jhangiani as 
 Nimrit Kaur Sodhi Malik: (before plastic surgery) (2012)
 Shivangi Kaur Sodhi: Nimrit's twin sister (2012–13)
Ankita Sharma as 
 Nimrit Kaur Sodhi Malik: (after plastic surgery) (2012–13)
 Natasha Oberoi: Yug's girlfriend (2012)
Wasim Mushtaq as Tej Malik-elder brother of Agam.Husband of Amrit. (2012–13)
Navi Bhangu as Agamdeep "Agam" Malik-younger brother of Tej. (2012–13)
Angad Hasija as Angad "Karan" Malik (2013)
Karan Veer Mehra as Yug Prakashan (2012–13)
Ananya Agarwal as Gurbani "Bani" Malik (2012–13)
Dhriti Mehta as Jyoti Malik (2012–13)
 S.P. Lalwani as Mahinder Malik (2012–13)
 Amardeep Jha as Rajmata Manpreet Kaur Sodhi (2012-2013)
 Gaurav Nanda as Bhupinder Singh/Pritam Bakshi (2012)
 Mohan Kapoor as Soojam Oberoi (2012)
 Deepak Sandhu as Vishal Sehgal (2012)
 Kishwer Merchant as Mrs. Adhiraj Singh (2012)
 Ananya Khare as Indu Chabiara (2013)
 Siddharth Vasudev as Rudraksh Singh (2012–13)

Guests
 Parul Chauhan
 Kashmera Shah

Crossover
The show had a crossover episode with Main Lakshmi Tere Aangan Ki. It also had a crossover episode with Dil Se De Dua...Saubhagyavati Bhava? on 12 September 2012.

References

External links
 Website
 Amrit Manthan/Bairi Behna streaming on Hotstar
 

2012 Indian television series debuts
Indian drama television series
Indian television soap operas
2013 Indian television series endings
Life OK original programming